Yuriy Yakovlev (5 October 1930 – 15 August 2002) was a Bulgarian stage and film actor.

He is probably best known for the role of the research worker Robespier Galabov portrayed by him in the Bulgarian hit movie The Past-Master (1970). His character appears also in the sequels The Past-Master on Excursion (1980) and The Past-Master at the Seaside (1982). Other notable film appearances include Gerlovo Event (1971) directed by Grisha Ostrovski and Farsighted for Two Diopters (1976) written by Mormarevi Brothers.  Yakovlev is also known for the numerous roles on the stage of the Theatre “Salza i Smyah” (Tear and Laughter), Sofia.

In 1979, Yuriy Yakovlev was decorated with the high title “Honoured Artist”.

Biography and career 
Yakovlev was born Yuriy Yurievich Yakovlev on October 5, 1930 in Riga, Latvia. His father Yuriy Dimitrievich Yakovlev, also actor and stage director, was of Russian descent. His mother Jeana Sladkarova - Yakovleva was a well known Bulgarian opera singer. Her brother Angel Sladkarov was among the founders of the operetta genre in Bulgaria. The first appearance on the stage of the young Yuriy Yurievich was at the age of 7 in a staging at Ivan Vazov National Theatre directed by his father. In 1955-56, after the graduation from The National Academy for Theatre and Film Arts, Yakovlev junior was appointed in the Pernik Theatre for a year. Between 1956 and 1966, he played with the so-called “Working Front Theatre” and “People's Stage Theatre”. In 1967, Yakovlev joined the troupe of the newly founded theatre “Salza i Smyah” (Tear and Laughter), Sofia where he remained until his retirement from the stage in 1992.

Filmography

References

Sources

External links

Bulgarian male film actors
Bulgarian male stage actors
Bulgarian male television actors
1930 births
2002 deaths
Actors from Riga
Bulgarian people of Russian descent
20th-century Bulgarian male actors